Straža is an abandoned village in the municipality of Lipkovo, North Macedonia.

Demographics
The 1971 Yugoslav census was the last to record any people as residing in the village which contained 89 inhabitants, all Albanians. According to the 2002 census, the village had 0 inhabitants.

References

External links

Villages in Lipkovo Municipality
Albanian communities in North Macedonia